Sharon Day-Monroe (born June 9, 1985) is an American heptathlete and high jumper.  She is the 2011, 2013, and 2014 national heptathlon champion, She is also the 2012-2015 national indoor pentathlon champion.  She is the first athlete to win four consecutive national championships in the pentathlon.  As a junior athlete, she was the 2003 Pan American Junior champion in the high jump and the following year won the bronze medal at the World Junior Championships.

She has qualified for multiple international championships.  At the 2008 Olympics she high jumped 1.85 to finish 24th in qualifying.  At the 2009 World Championships in Athletics in Berlin she competed in both the high jump, finishing 17th and the heptathlon finishing 10th as the top American finisher.  In subsequent heptathlons, she finished 18th at the 2011 World Championships in Daegu, South Korea.  She finished 16 at the 2012 Olympics in London.  At the 2013 World Championships in Moscow she finished 6th.

Biography
Sharon Day originally excelled in the high jump.  While at Costa Mesa High School she was the CIF California State Meet champion two years in a row, and was coached in the high jump by her father, Eugene Day. Day's mother, Yolanda Day, was an elite high jumper, and her sister, Jasmin Day, competed in the high jump for the University of Arizona.  While winning during her junior year, she defeated senior Chaunte Howard, who has gone on to become the current American record holder.

In 2003, she won the high jump at the Pan American Junior Championships in the high jump, again defeating Howard.  In 2004, she won the bronze medal at the World Junior Championships, which she qualified for by winning the USA National Junior Championships.

Day attended Cal Poly, San Luis Obispo where she won the 2005 NCAA Women's Outdoor Track and Field Championship while setting the school record in the high jump.  She since improved upon the record and also holds the school record in the heptathlon, which she attempted at the end of her college career, after also being a standout soccer player in the fall. Day also suffered a plant foot fracture in 2005 that required two surgeries and a year of rehabilitation. All of the heptathlon events except the high jump were taught to Day by her coach, Jack Hoyt. Day had not competed in the long jump, hurdles, shot put, javelin, 200 meters, or 800 meters prior to Spring 2007. She trained for these events after her soccer season.

While winning the Sam Adams Multi-Event meet at Westmont College in Montecito, California, Day achieved the "A" standard for the 2012 Olympics.

Day has been signed with ASICS since she graduated from college in 2008, for competition in both the high jump and heptathlon. She currently trains at UCLA with her coach, Jack Hoyt, and is a volunteer assistant with the UCLA team. On September 1, 2013, she married Dan Monroe, a Cal Poly alum and basketball coach. Day is 5' 9" tall.

Personal bests (outdoor)

Last updated 4 April 2015.

2004 World Junior Championships
Sharon Day earned a bronze medal in the high jump at the 2004 World Junior Championships in Athletics clearing 1.91 meters.

2005 NCAA Outdoor Championship
In June 2005, Day won the women's NCAA national outdoor-season high jump title for Cal Poly, with a clearance of 6–4.

2007 Outdoor championship
Sharon Day-Monroe earned silver medal in the high jump clearing 1.89m    6-02.25

2008 US Outdoor championship
Sharon Day-Monroe earned bronze medal in the high jump clearing 1.91m    6-03.25.
     1.79 1.84 1.89 1.91 1.93
        O    O   XO   XO  XXX

2008 Beijing Olympics
Sharon Day-Monroe placed 24th in the high jump clearing a height of 1.85 meters at Athletics at the 2008 Summer Olympics.

2009 US Outdoor championship
Sharon Day-Monroe earned silver medal scoring 6177 points.

2009 World Championship
Sharon Day-Monroe placed 10th in the 2009 World Championships in Athletics – Women's heptathlon scoring 6126 points, after 	Jessica Ennis of Great Britain won gold scoring 6731 points, Jennifer Oeser of Germany with silver scoring 6493 points and Kamila Chudzik of Poland with bronze scoring 6471 points.

2010 US Outdoor championships
Sharon Day-Monroe won the silver scoring 6006 points.

2011 US Outdoor championships
Sharon Day-Monroe won the heptathlon scoring 6058 points.

2011 World Championship
Sharon Day-Monroe, placed 18th in the 2011 World Championships in Athletics – Women's heptathlon scoring 6043 points, after Tatyana Chernova of Russia won gold with (6880 points), Jessica Ennis of Great Britain with silver (6751 points) and Jennifer Oeser of Germany with bronze (6572 points).

2012 Indoor Championships
Sharon Day-Monroe won the Pentathlon scoring 4567 points.

2012 US Olympic Trials
Sharon Day-Monroe won the silver with 6343 points

2012 London Olympics
Former Cal Poly All-American, Sharon Day-Monroe, finished 16th in the heptathlon at 2012 London Olympics on Saturday with (6232 points). Jessica Ennis of Great Britain won the gold with 6955 points followed by Lilli Schwarzkopf of Germany with the silver (6649 points) and Russia's Tatyana Chernova with the bronze (6628 points).

2013 USA Indoor championships
Sharon Day-Monroe won the  Pentathlon for the second consecutive year scoring 4478 points.

2013 USA Outdoor championships
Sharon Day-Monroe won heptathlon with 6550 points.

2013 Moscow World Championships
Day finished 6th in the Heptathlon at the 2013 World Championships in Athletics scoring 6407 points. Hanna Melnychenko of Ukraine won the gold (6586 points), Canada's Brianne Theisen-Eaton with the silver (6530 points) and Netherlands' Dafne Schippers with the bronze (6477 points).

2014 USATF Indoor Championship and American Record
Former two-time Cal Poly Women's Student-Athlete of the Year Sharon Day-Monroe broke the American pentathlon record on Friday afternoon at the USA Indoor Track & Field Championships in the Albuquerque Convention Center. It was the third consecutive national indoor championship for Day-Monroe, who finished with a score of 4,805. Day-Monroe's total was 238 points ahead of her previous career best, and eclipsed the old record — which had been shared by DeDee Nathan (set March 5, 1999) and Hyleas Fountain (tied March 10, 2013) — by a margin of 52. Day-Monroe will represent USA at the world indoor championships in Sopot, Poland.

Day-Monroe set a personal best of 8.44-second time in the 60-meter hurdles, then cleared 1.88 meters (or 6 feet, 2 inches) to win the high jump, and proceeded to put forth marks of 15.59 meters (or 51–1.75) in the shot put and 6.09 meters (or 19–11.75) in the long jump to put herself in solid position to claim the record. Needing a time of 2:16.87 in the 800 meters, Day-Monroe closed by finishing at 2:13.19.  For her record performance, she was named USATF "Athlete of the Week.".

Her mark was the World Leading performance of 2014 until the World Indoor Championships, where it was surpassed by Nadine Broersen.  Day-Monroe finished with 4718 points including a field leading 2:09.80 800 meters, just six points out of a podium position.

2014 USATF Outdoor Championship
Sharon Day-Monroe won the heptathlon with 6470 points.

2015 USA Indoor championships
Sharon Day-Monroe won the  Pentathlon scoring 4654 points.
Day-Monroe's fourth consecutive indoor championship.

2015 USATF Outdoor Championship
Sharon Day-Monroe was runner up to Barbara Nwaba in the heptathlon with 6458 points.

2015 Beijing World Championships
Day placed 14th in the Heptathlon at the 2015 World Championships in Athletics with 6246 Points.

2016 United States Olympic Trials (track and field)
Sharon Day-Monroe finished behind Barbara Nwaba, Heather Miller-Koch and Kendell Williams in the heptathlon with 6385 points.

2017 Indoor Championships
Sharon Day-Monroe earned silver medal for second place in the Pentathlon behind Erica Bougard scoring 4404 points at 2017 USA Indoor Track and Field Championships.

References

External links
 
 

1985 births
Living people
American female high jumpers
American heptathletes
People from Costa Mesa, California
Track and field athletes from California
African-American female track and field athletes
Olympic track and field athletes of the United States
Athletes (track and field) at the 2008 Summer Olympics
Athletes (track and field) at the 2012 Summer Olympics
World Athletics Championships athletes for the United States
USA Outdoor Track and Field Championships winners
USA Indoor Track and Field Championships winners
Cal Poly Mustangs athletes
Sportspeople from Orange County, California
21st-century African-American sportspeople
21st-century African-American women
20th-century African-American people
20th-century African-American women